Alvin Jerome McKinley (born June 9, 1978) is a former American football defensive tackle. He was drafted by the Carolina Panthers in the fourth round of the 2000 NFL Draft. He played college football at Mississippi State.

McKinley has also played for the Cleveland Browns, Denver Broncos and New Orleans Saints.

Early years
McKinley was a standout at Weir High School in Weir, Mississippi.  After winning two state championships, he joined his brother Dennis McKinley at Mississippi State University in the fall of 1996.

Professional career

Carolina Panthers
McKinley was drafted in the fourth roudn of the 2000 NFL Draft by the Carolina Panthers.

Cleveland Browns
McKinley joined the Cleveland Browns in 2001. He had his best season in 2005, recording 68 tackles and five sacks.

New Orleans Saints
McKinley was signed by the New Orleans Saints on September 10, 2008, after defensive tackle Hollis Thomas was placed on injured reserve. McKinley was released on September 19 to make room for quarterback Joey Harrington.

References

External links
Denver Broncos bio

1978 births
Living people
American football defensive ends
American football defensive tackles
Holmes Bulldogs football players
Mississippi State Bulldogs football players
Carolina Panthers players
Cleveland Browns players
Denver Broncos players
New Orleans Saints players
Players of American football from Jackson, Mississippi
People from Choctaw County, Mississippi